Ravang or Ravank may refer to:
 Ravang, Hormozgan (راونگ - Rāvang)
 Ravang, Razavi Khorasan (رونگ - Ravang)
 Ravang, Sistan and Baluchestan (رونگ - Ravang)